Kristaps Lībietis (born in Alūksne on ) is a retired Latvian biathlete.

He competed in the 2006 and 2010 Winter Olympics for Latvia. His best performance is 19th, in 2010 as part of the Latvian relay team. His best individual performance is 54th, in the 2006 sprint and pursuit. In 2006, he also finished 68th in the individual, and in 2010 he finished 64th in the sprint and 70th in the individual.

As of February 2013, his best performance at the Biathlon World Championships, is 17th, in the 2009 men's relay. His best individual performance is 50th, in the 2008 individual.

As of February 2013, his best Biathlon World Cup finish is 7th, as part of the Latvian men's relay team at Oberhof in 2009/10. His best individual finish is 37th, in the individual at Östersund in 2008/09. His best overall finish in the Biathlon World Cup is 104th, in 2008/09.

References 

1982 births
Biathletes at the 2006 Winter Olympics
Biathletes at the 2010 Winter Olympics
Latvian male biathletes
Living people
Olympic biathletes of Latvia
People from Alūksne